Yani Tseng (born 23 January 1989) is a Taiwanese professional golfer playing on the U.S.-based LPGA Tour. She is the youngest player ever, male or female, to win five major championships and was ranked number 1 in the Women's World Golf Rankings for 109 consecutive weeks from 2011 to 2013.

Amateur career
Tseng was the top-ranked amateur in Taiwan from 2004 to 2006. The highlight of her amateur career was winning the 2004 U.S. Women's Amateur Public Links, defeating Michelle Wie in the final, 1 up.
Her amateur accomplishments include:
 2002 Won – Callaway Junior World Golf Championships (Girls 13–14)
 2004 2nd place – Callaway Junior World Golf Championships (Girls 15–17)
 2004 Won – U.S. Women's Amateur Public Links
 2005 Won – North and South Women's Amateur Golf Championship
 2005 Semi-finalist – U.S. Women's Amateur Public Links
 2005 2nd place – North and South Women's Amateur Golf Championship

Professional career

2007
Tseng turned professional in January 2007. That year she competed on the Ladies Asian Golf Tour and won the DLF Women's Indian Open. She also competed on the CN Canadian Women's Tour where she won the CN Canadian Women's Tour at Vancouver Golf Club.

2008
Tseng entered the LPGA Qualifying Tournament in the fall of 2007 and finished sixth in the final Qualifying Tournament in December which gave Tseng full playing privileges on the LPGA Tour for 2008. In June 2008, she claimed her first LPGA tour victory at the LPGA Championship to become the first player from Taiwan to win an LPGA major championship. At age 19, she was also the youngest player to win the LPGA Championship and the second-youngest player to win an LPGA major.

Tseng was named LPGA Tour Rookie of the Year in 2008.

2009
On 29 March 2009, Tseng became the fastest player in LPGA history to reach the $2 million mark in career earnings. She achieved this mark in 32 events, spanning one year, one month, and 13 days. The previous record holder was Paula Creamer who reached the mark in one year, four months, and 15 days in 2006.

2010

On 4 April 2010, Tseng won the first major championship of the LPGA season, the Kraft Nabisco Championship, by one stroke. She went on to win her second major of the year on 1 August 2010 by winning the Women's British Open by one stroke and became the youngest woman in the modern era to win three major championships. LPGA founder Patty Berg was younger than Tseng when she won the 1939 Titleholders Championship. However, that was before the formation of the LPGA Tour in 1950 and the designation of official LPGA major tournaments.

In September 2010, Tseng was offered a five-year sponsorship deal from a Chinese company worth NT$1 billion (US$25 million) with access to a luxury villa and private jets. Tseng rejected the offer because it required she switch her citizenship from Republic of China to China.

2011
In January 2011, Tseng defended her title at the Taifong Ladies Open on the LPGA of Taiwan Tour. Three weeks later she won the ISPS Handa Women's Australian Open and a week later the ANZ RACV Ladies Masters, both events co-sponsored by the ALPG Tour and the Ladies European Tour. Her wins moved her into the number 1 position in the Women's World Golf Rankings. She won again the next week in the first tournament of the LPGA season, the Honda LPGA Thailand.

In June 2011, she won the LPGA State Farm Classic over Cristie Kerr by three strokes. Two weeks later, she won the LPGA Championship. This made her the youngest player to win four LPGA majors. The next month she defended her title at the Women's British Open, becoming the first defending champion winner at the Women's British Open as a major. Her five major titles also made her the youngest player, male or female, to win five major championships.

Tseng won the LPGA Tour Player of the Year for a second straight year. She wrapped up the award while the season still had four events remaining.

2012
Tseng won three of the first five events on the 2012 LPGA Tour: the Honda LPGA Thailand, the RR Donnelley LPGA Founders Cup and the Kia Classic.  The Honda LPGA Thailand victory was her second consecutive win at that event.

Mid-2012 career downturn
Tseng's career took a sudden downturn beginning in the latter part of the 2012 season. At the end of 2013, she had dropped from fourth to 38th place on the official LPGA money list and from first to 34th in the Women's World Golf Rankings.  Her performance dropped further in 2014; she ended that year at 54th on the official money list and ranked 83rd in the world.  Tseng has not won a LPGA tournament since March 2012 (Kia Classic).  After accumulating seven top-10 finishes, including four wins, in majors in 2010 through early 2012, starting with the 2012 Women's PGA Championship, she has missed the cut or did not play in a majority of the majors and finished no higher than T13 in the others.  There have been no reports of major injuries or other explanation for the sudden change.

Hall of Fame
Since March 2012, Tseng has been four points away from qualifying for the World Golf Hall of Fame via the LPGA points system, which requires 27 points for Hall of Fame eligibility. Tseng earned one point for each regular tour victory on the LPGA Tour and two points for every major championship victory. She also earned a point each for her two Rolex LPGA Player of the Year awards and one point for winning the Vare Trophy. If she accumulates the required 27 points before her tenth season on the LPGA Tour, she will have to wait until the tenth year to gain full Hall of Fame eligibility. Tseng has already met the requirement to win one LPGA major, Vare Trophy, or Rolex award.

Personal life
Tseng's father is Mao Hsin Tseng and her mother is Yu-Yun Yang.

Tseng lives in a residential community at Lake Nona Golf & Country Club in Orlando, Florida, in a house that she purchased from former LPGA player Annika Sörenstam in April 2009.

Tseng was named on Time magazine's list of the "100 Most Influential People in the World in 2012."

Professional wins (27)

LPGA Tour wins (15)

LPGA Tour playoff record (2–1)

Other wins (12)

Major championships

Wins (5)

1 Defeated Hjorth with birdie on fourth extra hole.

Results timeline
Results not in chronological order before 2019.

^ The Evian Championship was added as a major in 2013

CUT = missed the half-way cut
T = tied

Summary

Most consecutive cuts made – 15 (2009 British Open – 2013 LPGA)
Longest streak of top-10s – 4 (2010 U.S. Open - 2011 LPGA)

LPGA Tour career summary

 official as of 2018 season
* Includes matchplay and other events without a cut.

World ranking
Position in Women's World Golf Rankings at the end of each calendar year.

Team appearances
Amateur
Espirito Santo Trophy (representing Taiwan): 2004, 2006

Professional
Lexus Cup (representing Asia team): 2008
International Crown (representing Chinese Taipei): 2014, 2016

See also
List of golfers with most LPGA major championship wins
List of golfers with most LPGA Tour wins

References

External links

Taiwanese female golfers
LPGA Tour golfers
Winners of LPGA major golf championships
Asian Games medalists in golf
Asian Games bronze medalists for Chinese Taipei
Golfers at the 2006 Asian Games
Medalists at the 2006 Asian Games
Sportspeople from Taoyuan City
Golfers from Orlando, Florida
1989 births
Living people